The Providence Country Day School (often abbreviated to the initials PCD) is a private middle and high school, founded in 1923. Located in East Providence, Rhode Island, United States, it serves 255 students in grades 5 through 12.  The school has no religious affiliation and has been co-ed since 1991.

Administration 
Head of School - Kevin Folan

History 
In 1923, a group of business leaders, educators, and parents established Providence Country Day on the Sweetland Farm in East Providence. Their goal was to create a college-preparatory school in a rural setting, that would provide both the advantages of a boarding school campus and the additional benefits of a day school. Initially an all-boys middle and high school, the school admitted its first female students in 1991.

In 1997, the school completed an extensive campus consolidation and building project, renovating and moving two historic buildings, Metcalf and Chace Halls, to the east side of campus. At that time, Murray House also opened as the new administration building, and the Moran Annex was added to the West Field House, expanding the school’s athletic facilities. 

On March 9, 2021, a partnership was announced between PCD and the Henry Barnard School Parents Association. HBS had been facing closure at the end of the 2020-2021 academic year and had announced plans to open as an independent school. Beginning in the 2021-2022 academic year, HBS and PCD would function as one school community with two campuses, with PCD Head of School Kevin Folan serving as Head of School for both campuses, while a Head of Lower School would be hired to manage the HBS campus. There are plans to build a new school for Henry Barnard, but that will take three to five years.

Teams
There are 17 different sports played at PCD at the Middle School, Junior Varsity, and Varsity levels of competition. Athletic teams compete in either the Rhode Island Interscholastic League or the SENE division of the New England Preparatory School Athletic Conference, and each year at least 30% of the teams compete in league championships. In the fall PCD offers Cross Country, Soccer, Football, Volleyball, and Tennis (women's). Winter sports include Basketball, Gymnastics, Ice Hockey, (indoor and track & field), Swimming, and Wrestling. In the spring PCD competes in Baseball, Golf, Lacrosse, Sailing, Track & Field, and tennis (boys). The school's commitment to the participation in all areas of school life requires that students are members of at least two sports teams each year.

Signature programs

Study abroad

Each year, students are invited to enroll in international programs that emphasize language mastery, cultural awareness, and community service. Some international programs are available each year while others vary, depending on student and teacher interest. Among the locations PCD students have studied and traveled are Ecuador, France, Spain and Italy. Currently, students have the opportunity to spend a trimester exchange in Ecuador, visit Quebec City for a long weekend, spend spring break studying marine ecology in St. John, USVI, and travel to Peru to visit Macchu Picchu and other archaeological and cultural sites.

Rhode Island Philharmonic partnership

The Rhode Island Philharmonic Orchestra and Music School is across the street from the PCD campus. PCD Upper and Middle School students can enroll in individual instruction with the Music School's professional musicians, as well as use their facilities for class instruction and practice space. The Music School's performance space is also available for PCD musical groups.

Chafee Leadership Forum

Since 2000, the late senator John H. Chafee ’40 and his family and friends have sponsored the Chafee Leadership Forum, an annual dialogue with a notable leader in politics and society. Students throughout Rhode Island are invited to the Forum to experience unfolding political events, meet international and national leaders, and broaden their perspectives and understanding of contemporary issues. Recent Chafee Leadership Forum speakers have included U.S. Senator Jack Reed and former U.S. Senator Lincoln Chafee, as well as congressional candidates David Cicillini and Russell Taub.

Notable alumni

Billy Andrade, professional golfer
Geoff Cameron, midfielder, Stoke City F.C., US National Team
John Chafee, U.S. Senator from Rhode Island, Governor of Rhode Island
Lincoln Chafee, U.S. Senator from Rhode Island, Governor of Rhode Island
Ken Read, Sailor
Alissa Musto, Miss Massachusetts 2016
Jeff Buxton, wrestling coach

References

"2005 Championship Results", National High School Mock Trial Championship website, https://web.archive.org/web/20060211071758/http://69.93.17.186/test/results2005.cfm, 6/13/06
"PCD students write, build and perform in the 'Page to Stage' program", East Bay RI Top Stories, https://web.archive.org/web/20070927195650/http://www.eastbayri.com/story/303204614192293.php, 2/10/07

External links
Providence Country Day School website

Schools in Rhode Island
Private high schools in Rhode Island
Private middle schools in Rhode Island
Buildings and structures in East Providence, Rhode Island
Schools in Providence County, Rhode Island
Preparatory schools in Rhode Island
1923 establishments in Rhode Island
Educational institutions established in 1923